"Real Friends" is a song recorded by Cuban-American singer Camila Cabello for her debut solo studio album, Camila (2018). Written by Cabello, William Walsh, Louis Bell, Brian Lee and its producer, Frank Dukes, it was released as a promotional single with "Never Be the Same" on December 7, 2017. "Real Friends" has an acoustic guitar foundation. In its lyrics, Cabello reflects on her life and asks for an honest friendship. The song's minimalist production has elements of reggae, Latin and tropical music. The reimagined version of the song featuring American musician Swae Lee was released on August 16, 2018.

"Real Friends" was inspired by Cabello's dissatisfaction and loneliness from work-focused life in Los Angeles while she was finishing recording Camila. Music critics praised its acoustic sound and Cabello's vocals. "Real Friends" debuted in the top 100 of several countries, including Canada, the Netherlands, Portugal, Spain, Belgium and Ireland. Although it did not chart on the US Billboard Hot 100, it debuted at number six on the Bubbling Under Hot 100 chart.

Background and release

"Real Friends" was written by Cabello, Frank Dukes, William Walsh, Louis Bell and Brian Lee, while production was handled by Dukes. Cabello was motivated to write the song when she was in Los Angeles finishing her debut solo album, Camila (2018). Dissatisfied with the city and its industrial environment, she found herself lonely and disappointed – prioritising work, without a social life.

"Real Friends", the last song created for the album, was recorded at Electric Feel Recording Studios in West Hollywood by Louis Bell and mixed at MixStar Studios in Virginia Beach, Virginia by Serban Ghenea and John Hanes. The song was released a week after its recording with "Never Be the Same" on December 7, 2017, as an instant-gratification track to accompany digital pre-orders of Camila.

Composition and lyrics

"Real Friends" is a low-key song characterized by a minimalist production, with an acoustic guitar as the main instrument and a solo pop handclap as percussion. The verses are sung gently, with Cabello using her low register instead of her soprano voice. In the lyrics, she reflects on being surrounded by negative things and people, while asking for an honest friendship. In the chorus, Cabello sings: "I'm just lookin' for some real friends / All they ever do is let me down / Every time I let somebody in / Then I find out what they're all about". According to Mike Nied of Idolator, the singer "laments her ability to find true companionship over acoustic strings".

Lasting three minutes and 33 seconds, the song is influenced by tropical, reggae and Latin music. According to sheet music published by Sony/ATV Music Publishing on Musicnotes.com, "Real Friends" is composed in the key of C minor and set in common time at a moderate tempo of 92 beats per minute. Cabello's voice ranges from a low of B3 to a high of C5, and the music has a Cm7–Fm7–B–E/D chord progression.

Reception

Critical response
"Real Friends" received media attention for its lyrics, which were speculated to be about Cabello's relationship with her former girl group Fifth Harmony. Cabello denied that speculation in an Access interview, saying that the song did not refer to anyone in particular but was about her lonely experience in Los Angeles while she was recording the album.

Alex Petridis of The Guardian felt that the lyrics explored "nights spent feeling isolated while on tour". Elias Leight of Rolling Stone called "Real Friends" Cabello's sparest song in comparison with her past work. Variety described it as a "gentle, sparsely arranged ballad" that resembles "Love Yourself" (2015) by Canadian singer Justin Bieber. Jamieson Cox of Pitchfork complimented the softness of the track and Cabello singing "with real delicacy". Sam Lansky of Time cited the song and the "heartfelt" track, "Consequences", as "pretty" ballads which showcased Cabello's voice.

Chart performance
"Real Friends" debuted in the top 100 in Canada, the Netherlands, Scotland, Slovakia and Australia, while reaching the top 40 in Portugal, Denmark, Ireland and Belgium. The song never charted on the Billboard Hot 100 in the United States, but it debuted at number six on the Bubbling Under Hot 100.

Track listing
Digital download
"Real Friends" – 3:36

Credits and personnel
Credits adapted from the liner notes of Camila.Publishing Published by Sony/ATV Songs LLC (BMI) O/b/O Sony ATV Music Publishing (UK) Ltd./Maidmetal Limited (PRS)/Milamoon Songs (BMI) // EMI April Music, INC. (ASCAP) O/b/O EMI Music Publishing (PRS)/Nyankingmusic (ASCAP) // EMI April Music, INC./Nyankingmusic/WMMW Publishing (ASCAP) // Warner-Temerlane Publishing Corp. (BMI) O/b/O itself and Songs from the Dongs (BMI)Recording Recorded at Electric Feel Recording Studios, West Hollywood, California
 Mixed at MixStar Studios, Virginia Beach, Virginia
 Mastered at the Mastering Palace, New York City, New YorkPersonnel Camila Cabello – songwriting, lead vocals
 Frank Dukes – songwriting, production, guitar
 William Walsh – songwriting
 Vinylz – additional production
 Louis Bell – songwriting, vocals production, recording engineering
 Brian Lee – songwriting, guitar
 Morning Estrada – recording engineering
 Serban Ghenea – mixing
 John Hanes – engineering
 Kevin Peterson – mastering
 Ben Foran – guitar

Charts

Certifications

Release historyNotesSwae Lee reimagined version

On August 16, 2018, a reimagined version of the song featuring American musician and rapper Swae Lee of Rae Sremmurd was made available worldwide.

Background
Speaking with Rolling Stone, when asked of all the features he did, does he have a favorite, Swae Lee addressed that,

Chart performance
The remix peaked at number 37 in Hungary Single Top 40, number 99 in Ireland and RMNZ's New Zealand Hot Single chart position number 12.

Track listingDigital download – reimagined version'''
"Real Friends" (featuring Swae Lee) – 3:43

Charts

Certifications

Release history

References

External links

2010s ballads
2017 songs
2018 singles
Pop ballads
Songs written by Camila Cabello
Camila Cabello songs
Songs written by Brian Lee (songwriter)
Songs written by Louis Bell
Songs written by Frank Dukes
Songs about friendship
Song recordings produced by Frank Dukes
Song recordings produced by Louis Bell